Guillermo José Domenech Martínez (born 17 September 1950) is a Uruguayan lawyer, notary and politician. He is the President of the party Open Cabildo.

Born in Montevideo, Domenech attended St. Catherine's School and Ivy Thomas Memorial School, graduated from University of the Republic, where he studied law and notary. He served as a government notary, in the President's Office, from 1990 to 2019.

Political career 
In the 1989 elections he presented a list to the House of Representatives of the National Party Herrerism faction in support of Luis Alberto Lacalle, but he was not elected. In 2019, Domenech participated in the founding of the Open Cabildo Party, which proposed the candidacy of former Army Commander-in-Chief Guido Manini Ríos. In October, it was reported that Domenech would be the vice presidential running mate of Manini Ríos for the 2019 General Election.

In the 2019 general election, he was elected Senator for the 49th Legislature. He assumed that position, on February 15, 2020.

References

External links 

 Guillermo Domenech's virtual office

1950 births
Living people
20th-century Uruguayan lawyers
Uruguayan notaries
Uruguayan politicians
People from Montevideo
University of the Republic (Uruguay) alumni
Open Cabildo (Uruguay) politicians
Members of the Senate of Uruguay
21st-century Uruguayan lawyers
People educated at Ivy Thomas Memorial School